Carlos de Rokha (1920–1962) was a Chilean poet and writer.

Works
The work of de Rokha is collected in four publications:
Prophetic Song to the First World, 1944.
The Visible Order, 1956.
Memorial and Keys, 1964.
Pavana Rooster and the Harlequin, 1967 (second edition, 2002).

Enrique Lihn refers to the low coverage of de Rokha's work thus:

"The poetry of Charles of Rokha is one that would leave historiara gainful if, indeed, the whole of our literature. With its own characteristics, and distinct from other works, de Rokha recorded all-expressive formal concerns that have contributed to the development of a small but brilliant literary tradition."

References 

1920 births
1962 deaths
20th-century Chilean poets
20th-century Chilean male writers
Chilean male poets
Drug-related deaths